The Imperator Aleksandr II-class battleships were two battleships built for the Imperial Russian Navy in the 1880s. They were intended to counter the small armored ships of the other Baltic powers. Construction was very prolonged and the ships were virtually obsolescent when completed. They were optimized for ramming.

 served in the Baltic and Mediterranean Seas before becoming a gunnery training ship in 1904, but she was inactive during World War I before joining the Bolsheviks in 1917. She was sold for scrap in 1922. Imperator Nikolai I served in the Baltic and Mediterranean Seas as well as the Pacific Ocean during the First Sino-Japanese War and the Russo-Japanese War. She surrendered after the Battle of Tsushima in 1905 and was commissioned in the Imperial Japanese Navy before she was sunk as a target in 1915.

Design
They were designed according to the tactical theories of the day which emphasized ramming and incorporated a ram bow. In addition their forecastle deck sloped slightly downwards to allow the main guns to fire at the waterline of the enemy at short range as the ship closed to ram. A full transverse armored bulkhead protected the forward  guns from raking fire and no armor was originally provided to protect them from the side. They were given a full sailing rig to allow for deployments to the Mediterranean and other distant locations although it was never actually used. Imperator Nikolai I was originally going to be built to a completely different design, but this was changed at the last minute to a modified version of the Imperator Aleksandr II design, so there were significant differences between the two ships.

General characteristics
Imperator Nikolai I was dimensionally similar to her sister except that her draft was only . She was also  heavier than her sister.

The hull was subdivided by one centerline longitudinal and ten transverse watertight bulkheads and it had a double bottom extending from frame 12 to frame 74.

Propulsion
The Imperator Aleksandr II-class ships had two 3-cylinder vertical compound steam engines driving  screw propellers. Twelve cylindrical boilers provided steam to the engines.

Armament

The main armament of the Imperator Aleksandr II-class ships was a pair of  Obukhov Model 1877 30-caliber guns. Those in Imperator Aleksandr II were fitted in a twin barbette mount forward, but Imperator Nikolai Is guns were fitted in a turret. These guns had a maximum elevation of 15° and could depress 2° and could traverse 220°. 60 rounds per gun were carried. The rate of fire was one round every four to five minutes.

The four  Obukhov Model 1877 35-caliber guns were on center-pivot mounts in casemates at the corners of the citadel, the hull being recessed to increase their arcs of fire ahead or behind. The forward guns could traverse a total of 125°, including targets within about 4° of the centerline. The rear guns had an arc of fire of 105° and could fire on targets within about 10° of the centerline. These guns had a maximum elevation of 15° and could depress 5°. They were provided with 125 rounds per gun. The muzzle velocity achieved depended on the shell weight and the type of propellant. A 'light' shell with brown powder reached  while that same shell with smokeless powder achieved . A 277-lb 'light' shell had a maximum range of  when fired at an elevation of 15° with smokeless powder. The rate of fire was one round every minute or two.

The eight  Model 1877 35-caliber guns were mounted on broadside pivot mounts. Four were fitted between the 9-inch guns and had could traverse a total of 100°. The others were mounted at each end of the ship where they could fire directly ahead or astern. Each gun had an arc of fire of 130°. The guns could elevate to a maximum of 12° and depress 8°. A 'light' shell had a maximum range of  when fired at an elevation of 12°. They could fire one round per minute.

The ten  Hotchkiss revolving cannon were mounted in hull embrasures of the ship, between the nine and six-inch guns to defend against torpedo boats. Four  Hotchkiss revolving cannon were mounted in each fighting top.

Imperator Aleksandr II carried five above-water  torpedo tubes, two in the bow, two broadside tubes that could traverse 70° and a tube in the stern. Smaller  torpedo tubes could be mounted in four of the ship's cutters. 36 mines could be carried. Imperator Nikolai I had six torpedo tubes were that were arranged differently. Only one was in the bow, four were on the broadside, two forward and aft, and the usual stern tube.

Protection
Compound armor was used throughout the Imperator Aleksandr II-class ships. The configuration of the waterline belt in Imperator Nikolai I differed somewhat from her sister. At bow and stern it was six inches thick.

The barbette and turret sides had a thickness of 10 inches while the turret roof was 2½ inches thick. Originally there was no side armor above the main belt, but that was added when the original disappearing main guns mounts and their pear-shaped barbette were deleted and made some weight available. No partitions separated the casemated guns, nor was there any armor between the guns. The conning tower had  sides on the Imperator Aleksandr II, but they were only six inches thick on Imperator Nikolai I, but it had a 2½-inch thick roof on both ships.

Construction
 was named after the Emperor Alexander II of Russia. She was built by the New Admiralty Yard at Saint Petersburg. Laid down on 12 July 1885, she was launched on 13 July 1887, and completed in June 1891, although her trials lasted until the spring of 1892. Imperator Nikolai I was named after the Emperor Nicholas I of Russia. She was built by the Franco-Russian Works at Saint Petersburg. Construction began on 20 March 1886; she was launched on 1 June 1889, and completed in July 1891 although her trials lasted almost a year afterwards.

History
Imperator Aleksandr II served in the Baltic Fleet and represented Russia, along with the cruiser , at the opening of the Kiel Canal in June 1895. She ran aground in Vyborg Bay later that year, but suffered little damage. Joining the Mediterranean Squadron in August 1896, she supported Russian interests during the Cretan Revolt of 1897. Imperator Aleksandr II returned to Kronstadt in September 1901. She was reboilered in December 1903 and modified 1904–05 to serve as an artillery school ship with her secondary armament replaced by more modern guns. Her crew refused to suppress the mutinous garrison of Fort Konstantin defending Kronstadt in August 1906. She was assigned to the Artillery Training Detachment in 1907. During World War I, she was mainly based in Kronstadt where her crew was active in the revolutionary movement. She was renamed Zarya Svobody (: Dawn of Freedom) in May 1917. Turned over to the Kronstadt port authority on 21 April 1921, Imperator Aleksandr II was sold for scrap on 22 August 1922. She was towed to Germany during the autumn of 1922, but was not stricken from the Navy List until 21 November 1925.

According to Robert Gardiner in Conway's All the World's Fighting Ships 1860–1905, Imperator Aleksandr II was reconstructed in France between 1902 and 1904, with her torpedo tubes removed and her six and nine-inch guns exchanged for five  45-caliber guns and eight six-inch 45-caliber guns. Her revolver cannon were also exchanged for ten three-pounder guns. V.V. Arbazov in Bronenoset︠s︡ Imperator Aleksandr II confirms that the torpedo tubes were removed and claims that she had her nine-inch guns replaced by five 8-inch, the fifth being placed at the stern, her old six-inch guns were exchanged for newer, more powerful models, and four 47 mm and four 120 mm guns were added on the upper deck, presumably replacing the old revolver cannon. However, this happened in Russia, not France.

Imperator Nikolai I sailed in June 1892 for New York City to participate in the celebration honoring the 400th anniversary of the discovery of America. She was assigned to the Mediterranean Squadron upon her return and visited Toulon in October 1893. Sailing for the Pacific Ocean during the First Sino-Japanese War and arrived at Nagasaki, Japan on 28 April 1895, she remained in the Pacific until late 1896, when she returned to the Mediterranean Squadron and supported Russian interests during the Cretan Revolt. After returning to the Baltic in April 1898, Imperator Nikolai I was extensively refitted in 1899–1901 and received new engines and boilers. She returned to the Mediterranean in September 1901 and remained there for the next three years. Refitted in late 1904 during the Russo-Japanese War, she served as the flagship of the Third Pacific Squadron under Rear Admiral Nikolai Nebogatov and departed Liepāja on 15 January 1905 for the Pacific. She was slightly damaged during the Battle of Tsushima, receiving one hit from a 12-inch gun, two from eight-inch guns and two from six-inch guns, and suffered only 5 killed and 35 men wounded. She was surrendered, along with most of the Third Pacific Squadron, by Admiral Nebogatov the following day and was taken into the Imperial Japanese Navy as the 'Iki. After serving as a gunnery training ship until 1910, Imperator Nikolai I became a first-class coast defense ship and a training vessel.

See also

 List of ironclads of Russia

Notes

Footnotes

Bibliography

Further reading
 А.Б. Широкорад. Корабельная артиллерия российского флота 1867–1922 г. «Морская коллекция» № 2 за 1997 год.
 Моисеев С. П. Список кораблей русского парового и броненосного флота 1861–1917 г. М., Воениздат, 1948
 Чертеж ЭБР «Император Николай I». Тверь, «Ретро-Флот», 1993
 Вторая тихоокеанская эскадра. «Наваль», вып. 1, с. 24–29. М., 1991
 А.А. Белов «Броненосцы Японии». Серия "Боевые корабли мира"

External links

 Класс кораблей "Император Александр II" 
 Броненосец Император Николай I 
 Imperator Alexandr II Class

Battleship classes
 
Russo-Japanese War battleships of Russia